Katarzyna Radtke, née Schewe (born 31 August 1969) is a retired Polish race walker born in Bydgoszcz.

Achievements

See also
Polish records in athletics

References

1969 births
Living people
Polish female racewalkers
Athletes (track and field) at the 1992 Summer Olympics
Athletes (track and field) at the 1996 Summer Olympics
Athletes (track and field) at the 2000 Summer Olympics
Olympic athletes of Poland
Sportspeople from Bydgoszcz
Lechia Gdańsk athletes